Sir Arthur Lawrence Hobhouse (15 February 1886 – 20 January 1965) was a long-serving English local government Liberal politician, who is best remembered as the architect of the system of national parks of England and Wales.

Early life
Hobhouse was the son of prominent Liberal politician and MP Henry Hobhouse and the brother of peace activist, prison reformer, and religious writer Stephen Henry Hobhouse. Arthur Hobhouse was educated at Eton College, St Andrews University and Trinity College, Cambridge, where he graduated in Natural Sciences. At Cambridge, he was a Cambridge Apostle and a member of the Cambridge University Liberal Club, becoming Secretary in 1906 and was also the lover of John Maynard Keynes and Duncan Grant.

Career
Hobhouse practised as a solicitor until the outbreak of World War I, when he joined the British Expeditionary Force. After the War he joined the Claims Commission, dealing with claims against Allied forces in the Abbeville area, and rose to the rank of Staff Captain. Returning to civilian life, Hobhouse took to farming on a family estate Hadspen house and garden in Somerset.

Political career
He stood as Liberal candidate for Wells at the 1922 General Election when he finished a strong second. He was elected Member of Parliament for Wells at the 1923 General Election but lost the seat in 1924. He failed to regain Wells in 1929.

Electoral record

Local government
He was elected to Somerset County Council in 1925, became an alderman in 1934, and was chairman of the council from 1940 to 1947.

In 1945 he was appointed by Lewis Silkin, the Minister of Town and Country Planning, to chair the National Parks Committee. The resulting Hobhouse Report was the basis for the National Parks and Access to the Countryside Act 1949. Of the twelve parks it proposed, ten were implemented in the 1950s, while the remaining two, the New Forest and the South Downs, were proposed in 1999 and finally designated in 2005 and 2009, respectively.

Hobhouse was knighted in 1942. Sir Arthur also served as Chairman of the Rural Housing Committee 1942–1947, was pro-chancellor of Bristol University, and was both Chairman and President of the County Councils Association (now part of the Local Government Association).  For many years he was President of the Open Spaces Society, till his resignation in 1955.

Personal life
In his youth, Hobhouse's affairs were exclusively homosexual. He had long-standing affairs with the Bloomsbury Group members Lytton Strachey, Duncan Grant, and John Maynard Keynes. Hobhouse was considered extremely desirable in Edwardian gay circles, and was the subject of much infighting amongst the men of Bloomsbury.

Hobhouse married Konradin Huth Jackson, daughter of Frederick Huth Jackson, and they had five children together:
Elizabeth Hobhouse (1921–1995)
Henry Hobhouse (1924–2016)
Paul Rodbard Hobhouse (1927–1994)
Mary Hermione Hobhouse (1934–2014)
Anne Virginia Hobhouse (1936–)

Hobhouse's eldest daughter married first Michael Francis Eden later Lord Henley, and secondly Michael King, son of Cecil Harmsworth King. Hobhouse's eldest son, Henry, wrote Seeds of Change: Five Plants That Transformed Mankind. Henry was married three times, and had a daughter, Janet, who died in 1991. A younger son, Paul, married Penelope Chichester-Clark.

Sources
 Obituary: 'Sir Arthur Hobhouse: A long record of public service', The Times, 21 January 1965

See also
List of Bloomsbury Group people

External links 
 

1886 births
1965 deaths
People educated at Eton College
Alumni of the University of St Andrews
Alumni of Trinity College, Cambridge
British Army personnel of World War II
Knights Bachelor
Liberal Party (UK) MPs for English constituencies
Members of Somerset County Council
UK MPs 1923–1924
Arthur
English LGBT politicians
Bisexual politicians
LGBT members of the Parliament of the United Kingdom
LGBT military personnel